Actinocatenispora sera is a bacterium from the genus Actinocatenispora which has been isolated from soil in Niigata, Japan.

References 

Micromonosporaceae
Bacteria described in 2007